A differential wheeled robot is a mobile robot whose movement is based on two separately driven wheels placed on either side of the robot body. It can thus change its direction by varying the relative rate of rotation of its wheels and hence does not require an additional steering motion. Robots with such a drive typically have one or more castor wheels to prevent the vehicle from tilting.

Details

If both the wheels are driven in the same direction and speed, the robot will go in a straight line. If both wheels are turned with equal speed in opposite directions, as is clear from the diagram shown, the robot will rotate about the central point of the axis. Otherwise, depending on the speed of rotation and its direction, the center of rotation may fall anywhere on the line defined by the two contact points of the tires. While the robot is traveling in a straight line, the center of rotation is an infinite distance from the robot. Since the direction of the robot is dependent on the rate and direction of rotation of the two driven wheels, these quantities should be sensed and controlled precisely.

A differentially steered robot is similar to the differential gears used in automobiles in that both the wheels can have different rates of rotations, but unlike the differential gearing system, a differentially steered system will have both the wheels powered. Differential wheeled robots are used extensively in robotics, since their motion is easy to program and can be well controlled. Virtually all consumer robots on the market today use differential steering primarily for its low cost and simplicity.

Kinematics of Differential Drive Robots 

The illustration on the right shows the differential drive kinematics of a mobile wheeled robot. The orientation of the robot with respect to the global coordinate system is the angle . Assuming that the wheels are at any time in contact with the ground (there is no slip), the wheels describe arcs in the plane in such a way that the vehicle always rotates around a point (referred to as ⁣ - instantaneous center of rotation). The ground contact speed of the left wheel  and the right wheel  lead to a rotation of the vehicle by the angular velocity .

Differential Drive Controller 
One might face a situation where the velocity  and the angular velocity  are given as inputs, and the angular velocities of the left and right wheels  are sought as control variables (see figure above). In this case, the already mentioned equation can be easily reformulated.

one obtains the equation for the angular velocity of the right wheel 

The same procedure can be applied to the calculation of the angular velocity of the left wheel

Examples of differential wheeled robots
 Pioneer, PeopleBot, PowerBot & PatrolBot- the ActivMedia Robotics mobile robots.
 Armadillo, Robotican
 Khepera and e-puck
 Sbot
 Alice
 Roomba
 RoboMow
 Shonkbot, a minimal-cost, Arduino-based teaching robot
 Thymio
 Edison
 Giraff
 Big Trak
 SCUTTLE An open-source payload-capable robot for hobby and university research.

References

External links
 A Tutorial and Elementary Trajectory Model for the Differential Steering System of Robot Wheel Actuators by G.W. Lucas at the open source Rossum Project